The 1988 Cork Junior A Hurling Championship was the 91st staging of the Cork Junior A Hurling Championship since its establishment by the Cork County Board. The championship began on 25 September 1988 and ended on 13 November 1988.

On 13 November 1988, Valley Rovers won the championship following an 0–11 to 1–06 defeat of Newcestown in the final at Charlie Hurley Park. It remains their only championship title.

References

1988 in hurling
Cork Junior Hurling Championship